KOMPSAT or Korean Multi-Purpose Satellite is a series of South Korean multipurpose satellite for Earth observation, communications, meteorological, environmental, agricultural, and oceanographic monitoring applications.

Satellites

References 

Satellites orbiting Earth
Satellite series